Memory is the fourth studio album by American indie rock band Vivian Girls. It was released on September 20, 2019 by Polyvinyl Record Co., and is the band's first album since their split in 2014 and subsequent reformation.

Critical reception

Memory was met with universal acclaim from critics. At Metacritic, which assigns a weighted average rating out of 100 to reviews from mainstream publications, the album received an average score of 81, based on 12 reviews.

Track listing

Personnel
Credits are adapted from the album's liner notes.

Vivian Girls
 Katy Goodman – bass, vocals
 Ali Koehler – drums, vocals
 Cassie Ramone – guitar, lead vocals

Additional personnel
 Rob Barbato – production, engineering
 Drew Fischer – mixing
 John Greenham – mastering
 Be Hussey – engineering (assistant)
 Trevor McLoughlin – engineering (assistant)

Charts

References

External links
 

2019 albums
Vivian Girls albums
Polyvinyl Record Co. albums